Nicolas Ruwet (December 31, 1932 – November 15, 2001) was a linguist, literary critic and musical analyst. He was involved with the development of generative grammar.

Biography
Ruwet was born in Saive in Belgium and studied philology in Liège. Later he studied with Claude Lévi-Strauss and later still with Noam Chomsky and Roman Jakobson, both influences, at the Massachusetts Institute of Technology. He studied music privately.

Ruwet is best known for his work as a linguist and critic, but he was also a significant figure in musical analysis. He attempted to make his analyses completely objective by not making any a priori assumptions about how the music worked, instead breaking the piece down into small parts and seeing how those parts related to each other, thus discovering the syntax of the piece without reference to any external sources or norms. His work in this field constitutes a kind of musical semiology and his analytical methods were later named paradigmatic analysis.

Some of his musical analyses were published along with other works in Langage, musique, poésie [Speech, music, poetry] (1972).

Ruwet died in Paris.

Bibliography
(1967). Introduction à la Grammaire Générative. Plon.
(1973). An Introduction to Generative Grammar. .
(1991). Syntax and Human Experience.

See also
 Jean-Jacques Nattiez

References

External links
"Nicolas Ruwet (1932-2001)", UChicago.edu.

1932 births
2001 deaths
Belgian musicologists
20th-century musicologists